Grave Misconduct is a 2008 thriller television film directed by Armand Mastroianni, starring Fran Bennett and Crystal Bernard.

Cast
Crystal Bernard as Julia London
Vincent Spano as Tent Dobson
Roxanne Hart as Margo Lawrence
Dorian Harewood as Baxter Kyle
Joanna Miles as Catherine Hallow
Michael Cole as Jason Connelly

External links
 
 

2008 television films
2008 films
2008 thriller films
Films directed by Armand Mastroianni
Films scored by Kevin Kiner
American thriller television films
2000s English-language films
2000s American films